WRNS (960 kHz) is an AM radio station broadcasting a sports format featuring programming from CBS Sports Radio, as well as the affiliate for the Down East Wood Ducks. Licensed to Kinston, North Carolina, United States, the station is currently owned by Dick Broadcasting, through licensee Dick Broadcasting Company, Inc. of Tennessee.

In September 2017, Dick Broadcasting announced the purchase of Alpha Media stations in three markets — 18 stations and two translators in total, at a purchase price of $19.5 million. The acquisition of WRNS by Dick Broadcasting was consummated on December 20, 2017.

References

External links

RNS
Sports radio stations in the United States
CBS Sports Radio stations
Radio stations established in 1937
1937 establishments in North Carolina